is a train station on the Kashii Line operated by JR Kyushu in Higashi-ku, Fukuoka, Fukuoka Prefecture, Japan.

Lines
The station is the starting point of the Kashii Line.

Station layout 
The station, which is unstaffed, consists of a bay platform and a side platform serving two tracks. The station building, a modern concrete and glass structure, houses as a waiting room and automatic ticket vending machines. Platform 1 is linked to the station building. Platform 2 is accessed by means of a level crossing near the end of the track.

Adjacent stations

History
On 19 September 1942, the company, now renamed the Hakata Bay Railway and Steamship Company, with a few other companies, merged into the Kyushu Electric Tramway. Three days later, the new conglomerate, which assumed control of the station, became the Nishi-Nippon Railroad (Nishitetsu). Japanese Government Railways (JGR) which took over control of the station and the track which served it was designated the Kashii Line. With the privatization of Japanese National Railways (JNR), the successor of JGR, on 1 April 1987, JR Kyushu took over control of the station.

On 14 March 2015, the station, along with others on the line, became a remotely managed "Smart Support Station". Under this scheme, although the station became unstaffed, passengers using the automatic ticket vending machines or ticket gates could receive assistance via intercom from staff at a central support centre.

Passenger statistics
In fiscal 2016, the station was used by an average of 838 passengers daily (boarding passengers only), and it ranked 186th among the busiest stations of JR Kyushu.

References

External links
Saitozaki (JR Kyushu)

Railway stations in Fukuoka Prefecture
Railway stations in Japan opened in 1905
Stations of Kyushu Railway Company